FK Mladost or NK Mladost may refer to a number of association football clubs based in the former Yugoslavia. 
"Mladost" means "youth" in Macedonian, Serbo-Croatian and Slovene languages, while FK and NK are two variants of the local abbreviation for "FC", standing for "football club" (i.e. fudbalski klub or nogometni klub).

Thus, the term may refer to:

In Bosnia and Herzegovina
FK Mladost Doboj Kakanj
FK Mladost Gacko
NK Mladost Lištica (former name of NK Široki Brijeg used from the late 1950s to 1991)
FK Mladost Lončari
FK Mladost Velika Obarska

In Croatia
NK Mladost Cernik
NK Mladost Prelog
NK Mladost Proložac
NK Mladost Ždralovi

In Macedonia
FK Mladost Carev Dvor
FK Mladost Krivogaštani
FK Mladost Udovo

In Montenegro
OFK Mladost Lješkopolje
FK Mladost Podgorica

In Serbia
FK Mladost Apatin
FK Mladost Bački Jarak
FK Mladost Lučani
FK Mladost Novi Sad

Slovenia
NK Mladost Kranj (former name of NK Sava Kranj used from 1945 to 1974)

See also 
KK Mladost (disambiguation)
FK Jedinstvo (disambiguation)
FK Radnički (disambiguation)